Thailand's Department of Fisheries (Abrv: DOF;), part of the Ministry of Agriculture and Cooperatives, is responsible for the promotion of the Thai fishing industry while ensuring the sustainability of aquaculture and capture fisheries. It conducts, compiles, and disseminates research and technologies to further those aims. Its mission statement makes no mention of illegal, unreported and unregulated fishing (IUU), the responsibility of other agencies such as the Ministry of Labour.

History
The government began to take an interest in Thai fisheries management in 1901, primarily as a source of taxes and tariffs.

A royal proclamation on 22 September 1921 gave the Ministry of Lands and Agriculture responsibility for aquaculture, preservation of aquatic animals, and regulating fishing equipment. 

The Department of Aquatic Animal Conservation was established on 21 September 1926. It was renamed the Department of Fisheries (DOF) in 1933, then combined with the Department of Agriculture as the Department of Agriculture and Fisheries. Two years later, it was again made a separate department. In 1954 it assumed its current name, Krom Pramong, 'Department of Fisheries'.

Mission
The department is both a promotional and regulatory agency, with emphasis on the former.

Organization
DOF's central administration is composed of 24 units. At the local level, the department has offices in all 76 provinces as well as 527 DOF district offices.

Budget
The DOF's budget was 4,094 million baht in FY2019, down from 4,457 million baht in FY2018.

Legal framework
Many laws deal with aspects of Thai fisheries. These are the most salient according to the FAO:
 Royal Ordinance on Fisheries B.E. 2560 (2017)
 Royal Ordinance on Fisheries B.E.2558 (2015)
 The Wildlife Reservation and Protection Act, B.E. 2535 (1992)
 The Enhancement and Conservation of National Environmental Quality Act, B.E. 2535 (1992)
 Fisheries Act B.E. 2490 (1947) Revised in 1953 and 1985.
 The Act Governing the Right to Fish in Thai Waters, B.E. 2482 (1939)
 The Thai Vessel Act, B.E. 2481 (1938)

Activity
Pramong Nomklao Fair (งานประมงน้อมเกล้า, "offered to royal fisheries fair") has been held annually since 1986 in various places or leading shopping malls around Bangkok and its vicinity, to promote the ornamental fish farming industry in the country and honour the Prince Mahidol Adulyadej.

See also
 Fisheries management
 Ocean fisheries
 Thailand fisheries
 World fish production

References

Government departments of Thailand
Fishing in Thailand
Fishing organizations
Ministry of Agriculture and Cooperatives (Thailand)